Vishnevka is a rural locality (a settlement) and the administrative center of Stepnovskoye Rural Settlement, Pallasovsky District, Volgograd Oblast, Russia. The population was 1,280 as of 2010. There are 15 streets.

Geography 
Vishnevka is located on the Caspian Depression, 77 km south of Pallasovka (the district's administrative centre) by road. Zhanibek is the nearest rural locality.

References 

Rural localities in Pallasovsky District